The 1969 Cork Intermediate Hurling Championship was the 60th staging of the Cork Intermediate Hurling Championship since its establishment by the Cork County Board in 1909. The draw for the opening round fixtures took place on 26 January 1969. The championship ran from 20 April to 28 September 1969.

The final was played on 28 September 1969 at the Castlemarty Grounds, between Youghal and Cobh, in what was their first ever meeting in the final. Youghal won the match by 3-07 to 0-13 to claim their second championship title overall and a first title in 14 years.

Results

First round

Quarter-finals

Semi-finals

Final

References

Cork Intermediate Hurling Championship
Cork Intermediate Hurling Championship